Scenes from the Past (or Pictures of the Past; , first published in English as The Trilogy of Alexander Sukhovo-Kobylin), is a trilogy of satirical plays by Alexander Sukhovo-Kobylin, written from 1854 to 1869. The first play, Krechinsky's Wedding was written in 1854 during Sukhovo-Kobylin's imprisonment, premiered in 1855 and published in Sovremennik magazine in 1856. The second play, The Trial was written in 1858 an premiered only in 1881, as hadn't passed the censorship. The last play of the trilogy, Tarelkin's Death was written in 1869 and premiered only in 1900.

Background 
In 1850 Sukhovo-Kobylin gets arrested as a suspect in the murder of his French mistress Louise-Simone Dimanche. Five of his serfs have testified his culpability during police interrogations. As it was established later, their testimonies were false and extorted by torture. To get himself distracted from dark thoughts, Sukhovo-Kobylin writes a comedy Krechinsky's Wedding. In 1855 the play stages in Maly theatre and becomes one of the most performed plays of Russia. 

As Sukhovo-Kobylin wrote himself, he only managed to achieve acquittal by means of giving enormous bribes to court officials and by using all of his contacts in the Russian elite. In 1858 he completes the second play in the trilogy, The Trial (or The Case), based on his imprisonment experience. The play was banned for staging by censorship until 1881, although it was published as a print with other parts of the trilogy in 1869 by Mikhail Katkov.

The final and the most grotesque play in the trilogy, Tarelkin's Death he writes in 1869. It was approved by censorship to stage only in 1900 with various edits. Russian literary critic Varvara Babitskaya compares it to Franz Kafka's absurdist works.

Main characters 

Pyotr Konstantinovich Muromsky, a prosperous landowner
Lidochka, Muromsky's daughter
Anna Antonovna Atuyeva, Lidochka's aunt
Vladimir Dmitriyevich Nelkin, a landowner, Muromsky's neighbour 
Ivan Antonovich Rasplyuyev
Tishka, Muromsky's doorman
Maxim Kusmich Varravin, Active State Councillor
Candide Kastorovich Tarelkin, Collegiate Councillor
Chibisov, Ibisov and Omega, clerks
Ivan Sidorovich Razuvayev
Ivan Andreyevich Zhivets
Kasyan Kasyanovich Shilo, clerk

Plot

Krechinsky's Wedding

The Case

Tarelkin's Death

References

Bibliography 

 Lotman L. M. "Sukhovo-Kobylin". In Istoriia russkoi literatury v 10 tomakh, 8:487–509. Moscow, Leningrad: Izdatel'stvo AN SSSR, 1956.
 Sokolinskii, E. K., ed. A. V. Sukhovo-Kobylin: bibliograficheskii ukazatel' literatury o zhizni i tvorchestve pisatelia, postanovkakh trilogii. St. Petersburg: Giperion, 2001. .
 Starosel'skaia N. D. Sukhovo-Kobylin. Moscow: Molodaia gvardiia, 2003. .
 Tunimanov V. "Krechinskii i Raspliuev". In Sukhovo-Kobylin A. V.: Svad'ba Krechinskogo, 86–95. Leningrad: Detskaia literatura, 1983.

Russian plays
Satirical plays
Russian plays adapted into films
Bureaucracy in fiction
Plays set in the Russian Empire
1855 plays
1858 plays
1869 plays
1881 plays
1900 plays
Works originally published in Sovremennik 
Plays adapted into operas